Karel Roden (born 18 May 1962) is a Czech actor, popularly known for his roles in Hellboy and The Bourne Supremacy, and his voice work in Grand Theft Auto IV.

Life and career
Roden followed his father and grandfather into acting. Roden first graduated from the Comprehensive Art Secondary School for Ceramics before being admitted to the Academy of Performing Arts in Prague.

Roden's feature film career began almost simultaneous with his theatre work in 1984 as Honza, a medical student in the 2nd part of a trilogy entitled "How the poets are losing their illusions" (Jak básníci přicházejí o iluze), a lighthearted, comic look at life through the lives of young university students. Roden's Honza also appeared in the final installation of the trilogy, "How poets are enjoying their lives" (Jak básníkům chutná život). 

Other comic turns include Roden's Captain Tuma in Who's That Soldier?, a humoristic look at life as a soldier in the socialist Czech army, the character Dragan in the action-thriller Dead Fish with Gary Oldman and Terence Stamp. In the comedy crime-thriller Shut Up and Shoot Me, Roden plays the hen-pecked husband hired to assassinate a grieving widow.

During the 1990s, he spent some time in London, which improved his English and gave him necessary exposure and access to the international scene. Hence, since being outside of Czechoslovakia he has become known mostly for his character actor roles which began in 2001 when Roden secured his first major role in the American psychological thriller, 15 Minutes, where he played the criminal Emil Slovak partnered with Oleg Taktarov opposite NYPD cop Flemming played by Robert De Niro. This was followed by a similar role, as the lawyer Carter Kounen, in the service of a vampire clan, in the movie Blade II in 2002.

This was followed by what became a series of type-cast roles including the action movie Bulletproof Monk, where he plays the Nazi megalomaniac Strucker. This was no doubt due to his heavy accent and distinct features, which bring him close to the stereo-typed Hollywood villain, although his voice was dubbed over by another actor in Blade II. This greatly understates, however, the plethora of characters he has portrayed throughout his career, particularly in Czechoslovakia.

His movie roles to date include 15 Minutes (2001), Blade II (2002), Bulletproof Monk (2003), The Bourne Supremacy (2004), as Grigori Rasputin in Hellboy (2004), Running Scared (2006), Largo Winch (2008), RocknRolla (2008), and Orphan (2009). He also played the Russian movie critic Emil Dachevsky in the film Mr. Bean's Holiday (2007). He played Noble Thurzo in Bathory (2008), co-production movie filmed by Slovak director Juraj Jakubisko, A Lonely Place to Die (2011) and a role as the Czech mobster Karel Benes in the TV series McMafia (2019).

For his main character in Guard No. 47, Karel Roden received the Czech Lion Award for Best Actor in Leading Role. 8 years later, he received the same award for the portrayal of Jan Masaryk in A Prominent Patient. He also received Alfréd Radok Award in 1998 for performing Bruno in Le Cocu Magnifique by Fernand Crommelynck. Other notable role was Don Juan in Grabbe's Don Juan and Faust (Divadlo v Dlouhé). He also appeared in two plays with his brother Marian. He was also a member of the prestigious Prague National Theatre. At the moment he can be found at Theatre Studio DVA in several performances.

Roden has also voiced Mikhail Faustin and Wade "The Fixer" Johnson in the video game Grand Theft Auto IV.

Filmography

Film

Television

Video Game

References

External links
 Biography, including list of roles (in Czech)
 
 Karel Roden – Juraj Thurzo

1962 births
Living people
Czech male film actors
Czech male stage actors
Czech expatriates in the United Kingdom
Czech expatriates in the United States
Actors from České Budějovice
Czech male video game actors
Academy of Performing Arts in Prague alumni
Sun in a Net Awards winners
20th-century Czech male actors
21st-century Czech male actors
Czech Lion Awards winners